Mineral Area College is a public community college in Park Hills, Missouri. Students can complete a wide variety of certificate and 2-year degree programs. Students may transfer to four-year institutions to complete bachelor's degree programs or they may participate in the 2+2 programs offered on campus by Central Methodist University or University of Missouri-St. Louis. The school enrolled 2,640 students in 2019.

History 
Founded in 1922 as Flat River Junior College, the original college was created by the Flat River Board of Education to train teachers and offer two year college education to graduating high school students. In the 1960s, enrollment had increased and a need for a larger facility was assessed. Through a popular vote by residents in six public school district in 1965, the Flat River Junior college was transitioned to Mineral Area College. In 1966 the career and technical education division was formed and nursing programs were then added in 1967. The current main campus outside of Leadington, MO was purchased in 1967 and operations moved to the larger campus in 1970.  The college grew throughout the 80's and 90's, adding more buildings and programs to better meet the needs of the area. College Park was added in 2000 and the Fredericktown Outreach Center was built in 2010. Now, MAC has over 11,000 alumni and has graduated students from many different states and countries.

Mission 
Mineral Area College serves the community by providing students a quality, affordable education and offers opportunities for personal growth and career development in a safe, professional environment.

Locations

Main Campus 
The main campus is located within St. Francois County in Park Hills, MO. The campus is 86 miles north of Cape Girardeau, MO and 66 miles south of St. Louis, MO.

The 226 acre main campus boasts a convenient quadrangle design encompassing an attractive courtyard for student activities.  The four-sided building layout is composed of the C.H. Cozean Library, "The Bob" Robert E. Sechrest Sr. Field House, Fine Arts, Allied Health, Arts & Sciences, and Technology buildings. With the construction of a breezeway to connect the library to the second floor of the technology building, it is possible to walk through the entire main campus from the field house to the fine arts building.

The North College Center and Law Enforcement Academy are located on the north side of campus off of Dixie Kohn Drive.

Fredericktown Outreach Center 
The Fredericktown Outreach Center is located just off of Hwy 67 South next to Black River Electric Co-op offices.

Perryville Higher Education Center 
The Perryville Higher Education Center is located in the former library building of St. Mary’s of the Barrens campus.

Potosi Outreach Center 
The Potosi Outreach Center is located within the Potosi High School.

Taxing District and Service Region 

Mineral Area College was founded and developed as a college to support students from six school districts: North County R-1, Central R-3, Farmington R-7, Bismarck R-5, West County R-4, and Fredericktown R-1. Mineral Area College has a broad service region, but is primarily supported through portions of the voter-approved property tax revenue in the smaller taxing district. School districts have voted to join the taxing district since 1965 and students living in these districts receive reduced tuition benefits. Due to the extensive west-to-east size of the service district, voter rejections, or other economic issues, not every public school in the service district supports MAC through tax revenue, but still receive service benefits from the college.

Currently, Mineral Area College is supported by taxing districts in St. Francois County, Madison County and portions of Ste. Genevieve, Washington, Jefferson and Perry counties. The service region consists  of all of St. Francois, Ste.  Genevieve, Perry, Madison, Iron, Washington, Shannon and Texas counties.

Academics and Technical Programs 
Mineral Area College offers several Associate's degrees and certificate programs for students.

Degrees 

 Associate of Arts
 Associate of Arts in Teaching
 Associate of Science
 Allied Health Related, ADN - Advanced Placement
 Allied Health Related, Associate Degree Nursing RN
 Allied Health Related, Respiratory Therapy 
 Associate of Applied Science
 Associate of General Studies

Certificates 

 Automotive Collision Technology 
 Automotive Technology 
 Business Management
 Child Development Associate
 Child Development
 Community Paramedic Program
 Computer Networking
 Connector and Conductor 
 Construction Building Technology
 Criminal Justice
 Digital Media Technology 
 Electrical Technology
 Electrical/Electronics Technology
 Emergency Medical Technician
 Engineering Technology - Design Draft
 Engineering Technology - Manufacturing
 Global Studies
 Graphic Arts/Printing Technology
 Heating, AC and Refrigeration Technology
 Industrial Maintenance
 Law Enforcement
 Logistics Technician
 Machine Tool Technology
 Paramedic Technology
 Practical Nursing
 Production Technician
 Welding Technology

Mineral Area Fine Arts Academy 
The Mineral Area Fine Arts Academy was created in 2021 in a response to a void in higher education fine arts after declines in enrollment and subsequent fine arts program cancellations at Mineral Area College. The Fine Arts Academy operates on the Mineral Area College main campus and will provide classes and productions in theatre, music, and visual art.

Mineral Area Council on the Arts (MACOA) 
Mineral Area Council on the Arts (MACOA) began in 1982 as  Mineral Area College Arts Council, a committee formed by Dixie Kohn at Mineral Area College. The group brought cultural events and a broader exposure of fine arts to the college campus. The independent Mineral Area Council on the Arts was established in 1989 and in 1990 registered its Articles of Incorporation with the State of Missouri in 1990.

In addition to the Executive Director, the Council is led by a Board of Directors of 8 men and women from throughout the region who serve to bring quality arts and cultural events to our community. The main MACOA office is located in the Fine Arts building on the main campus of Mineral Area College.

Athletics 

The Mineral Area College Cardinals are represented by the mascot "Kirby the Cardinal".

Mineral Area College is a member of the National Junior College Athletic Association Division I, NJCAA Region XVI and the Missouri Community College Athletic Conference.

Athletic teams include Men and Women's Basketball, Soccer, Track & Field; Men's Baseball and Golf; Women's Softball and Volleyball; Coed E-Gaming and Cheerleading.

Robert E. Sechrest Sr. Field House 
The field house on the main campus is colloquially referred to as "the Bob" by student athletes and faculty. The gym is named after Missouri Sports Hall of Fame Inductee, Robert "Bob" Sechrest to honor his lifetime accomplishments.

Student Activities

College Park 
College Park Residences provide independent living for students of Mineral Area College and Central Methodist University on the Park Hills campus. Students reside in a convenient learning environment that provides the benefit of living close to classes, library, local resources, shopping, and security.

The College Park community includes a swimming pool, club house with big screen TV, laundry facility, computer lab, sand volleyball court, barbecue pavilion, and private mailboxes. These amenities add to the benefits received when leasing a College Park Residence.

Disc Golf 
Mineral Area College has a large 18 hole disc golf course beginning directly off of the main parking lot. The course was designed by Al Kennon and constructed through a partnership with the college and the Boy Scouts of America.

Quarry Pond 
The 2.0 acre quarry pond is located behind the baseball field off of Dixie Kohn drive. The Missouri Department of Conservation managed pond can be accessed by students and the public during daylight hours to enjoy jogging along the paved path, lounging between courses, or fishing for black bass, catfish, and sunfish.

Sgt. Darrell S. Cole Memorial Shooting Range 
The Sgt. Darrell S. Cole Memorial Shooting Range is a part of the overall St. Joe State Park/Mineral Area College Shooting Range program. The shooting range's primary purpose is to provide a controlled environment for the novice to the experienced shooter that allows them to feel safe and obtain answers and assistance.

Student Organizations and Clubs  

 Archery Club
 Art Club
 Cardinal Congregation
 Chi Alpha
 Cultural Awareness Club
 GSA
 MAC Ambassadors
 MoSALPN
 Omega Leo
 Phi Beta Lambda
 Phi Theta Kappa
 Robotics Club
 Student Activities Council
 Student Government Association
 Student-Missouri State Teachers Association
 Student Nurses' Association
 Veterans Organization

Campus Resources

Library 
The library is located off of the main parking lot and is a foundation of the main campus quadrangle. The building is named in honor of C. H. Cozean. Mr. Cozean was a prominent Farmington, Missouri, businessman in a family-owned business dating back to 1864. The C. H. Cozean Library now contains historical data on the Cozean family and some of the connecting families. The Library also has a display that highlights some of the rich history of the Cozean family.
. Students can check out books, music, movies, disc golf, and other field equipment.

Academic Resource Center 
Located inside of the Learning Center in the concourse of the Arts & Sciences building.

TriO Programs 
Mineral Area College hosts three TRiO programs: Upward Bound, EXCEL/Student Support Services (SSS) and Educational Talent Search. These programs, funded by the Department of Education, help eligible students overcome barriers to successfully participating in higher education. All services offered by the TRiO programs are provided at no cost to participants.

Bookstore 
The Mineral Area College Bookstore is attached to the Sechrest Field House. Students can access the bookstore in-store and online.

Career Services 
This service is available to anyone, college student or community member. Career services offers resources to help give a better understanding of interests, abilities and career values. The service can help gather information on job descriptions, earnings, employment trends, job outlook, training/education required, and more.

Public Transportation 
Mineral Area College is a middle stopping location for both of the newly created North and South St. Francois County routes of the Southeast Missouri Transportation Service. "Anyone Can Ride" the SMTS bus routes with the North Route (Bus B) servicing Bonne Terre, Desloge, Elvins, and Park Hills and the South Route (Bus A) servicing Park Hills and Farmington. This is the only major form of public transportation in the area and provides a ride into town for many community members and students living in College Park.

Major Highways 

 U.S. Route 67 connects Mineral Area College south to Fredericktown and Poplar Bluff, while north leads to Bonne Terre, De Soto, and Festus.
 I-55 indirectly connects Mineral Area College north to St. Louis, via Hwy 67, and south to Cape Girardeau by way of Highway Route 32.

College Divisions and Departments 
In 2020, the Career & Technical Education college and Arts & Sciences college were merged into one academic body under a Provost of Instruction. Departments and programs were assigned to one of six newly formed academic divisions. In 2021, the departments in the Science, Agriculture, and Math division were reassigned after the reduction of the agriculture program.

Currently, Mineral Area College offers courses and programs through five different academic divisions.

Social media 
Mineral Area College actively engages with students and the public on many social media platforms including YouTube, Facebook, Twitter, Instagram, and LinkedIn.

Alumni/Foundation

Cardinal Booster Club 
The Mineral Area College Cardinal Booster Club is the foundation of athletics, raising money to fund scholarships and operating to assist our student athletes. With the rising costs in higher education and budget cuts across the board, the Cardinal Booster Club is essential for the vitality of our sports programs. Members of the Cardinal Booster Club protect this athletic department, acknowledging the worth of a quality student athlete experience in the classroom, community, and on all playing fields at Mineral Area College.

Mineral Area College Foundation 
In 1983, a group of civic-minded citizens recognized the value Mineral Area College brings to our community: educationally, culturally and economically. The vision of these individuals created Mineral Area College Foundation, Inc. as a fund-raising appendage for Mineral Area College. For three decades, the Foundation, a 501(C)3 not-for-profit corporation, has worked as a vehicle to enhance the college’s mission. The Foundation’s mission is to advance, encourage, assist, promote and support the growth and development of Mineral Area College, its student body, faculty and administration. The activities and objectives of the Foundation include both ongoing and special projects and shall also include development and improvement of the college’s physical facilities. Much of the Foundation’s work has been quietly accomplished. The Foundation exemplifies a symbiotic relationship among alumni, business and friends of the college to enrich college programs as well as the quality of life in our local communities.

Board of trustees 
The Mineral Area College Board of Trustees is made up of locally elected individuals from the five sub-districts within the greater taxing district of the college.

 Alan Wells
 Sub-district: At-Large 
 Residence: Farmington  
 Profession: Director for St. Francois/Ste. Genevieve Counties Joint Communications Center 
 Education: Attended Mineral Area College and Southeast Missouri State University
 First elected to Board: 2013
 Scott Sikes
 Sub-district: 1 
 Residence: Fredericktown 
 Profession: Middle School Principal and Head Baseball Coach 
 Education: M.A., Secondary Education Administration, Southeast Missouri State University
 First elected to Board: 2009
 Lisa Umfleet
 Sub-district: 2 
 Residence: Bonne Terre 
 Profession: Pharmacist 
 Education: B.S., Pharmacy, St. Louis College of Pharmacy
 First elected to Board: 2016
 Stuart "Mit" Landrum, Jr.
 Sub-district: 3 
 Residence: Farmington 
 Profession: President of Mitware, LLC 
 Education: B.A. Physics
 First elected to Board: 2018
 Harvey Faircloth
 Sub-district: 4 
 Residence: Park Hills 
 Profession: Retired from Southwestern Bell 
 Education: Attended Flat River Junior College, M.S., National Lewis University
 First elected to Board: 2005
 Camille Nations
 Sub-district: 5 
 Residence: Bismarck 
 Profession: Retired Teacher from Central School District 
 Education: B.S., Music Education, Southwest Missouri State
 First elected to Board: 2018

Accreditation 
Mineral Area College and its outreach centers are accredited through the Higher Learning Commission, A Commission of the North Central Association of Colleges and Schools.

Mineral Area College degrees and programs are approved by the Missouri Coordinating Board for Higher Education, Jefferson City, MO.

References

External links 
 Official website



Community colleges in Missouri
Schools in St. Francois County, Missouri
NJCAA athletics
Two-year colleges in the United States
Educational institutions established in 1965
1965 establishments in Missouri